In the 16th century the Ottomans led a few expeditions to Morocco.

Capture of Fez (1554)

Background
In the early 16th century in Morocco, the country was not united under one dynasty and the Wattasids and Saadis became enemies which led to the Wattasids seeking military help from the Ottomans.

First period of vassal status
In 1545 Ali Abu Hassun, the Wattasid ruler in northern Morocco, recognised the full authority of the Ottoman sultan, sent a letter of submission and declared himself an Ottoman vassal thus attributing a vassal status to Fez. Later on in 1549, the Ottomans were unable to militarily intervene when the Wattasids lost Fez to their Saadian rivals under their leader Mohammed ash-Sheikh.

Second period of vassal status

Abu Hassun’s alliance with the Ottomans ultimately led to the Capture of Fez in 1554. According to Louis de Chénier, the forces of Salah Rais consisted of 4,000 troops and the forces of Mohammed ash-Sheikh were more than 20,000 and outnumbered Salah Reis’ army by more than five to one. According to Ernest Mercier, Salah Reis’ troops were numbered at 11,000 men while ash-Sheikh's forces were numbered at 40,000. Salah Reis was able to defeat the Saadians and conquer Fez installing the Wattasid sovereign Abu Hassun on the throne as a vassal of the Ottomans.

Aftermath
The Ottoman troops, Turks and Berbers from Kabylia stayed in Fez for four months harassing the population until Ali Abu Hassun bought the withdrawal of the Ottoman troops. Upon his withdrawal from Fez, Salah Rais assured the Saadi ruler that he would grant his enemy, Ali Abu Hassun, no further assistance. Ali Abu Hassun then hired mercenaries for his own army. However, the Wattasids now without the help of the Ottoman troops were defeated in the Battle of Tadla and Fez was reconquered by the Saadis.

Capture of Fez (1576)

Background
After the Saadi ruler ash-Sheikh had been assassinated by the Ottomans, Abd al-Malik and his brother fled from Morocco. During his exile, Abd al-Malik became  a trusted member of the Ottoman establishment. Murad III agreed to a proposition made by Abd al-Malik of making Morocco an Ottoman vassal in exchange for Murad’s support in helping him gain the Saadi throne. Murad III then ordered the governor of Algiers, Ramadan Pasha, to invade Morocco and install Abd al-Malik on the throne as an Ottoman vassal, and so they left from Algiers.

Third period of vassal status

Ramadan Pasha arrived in Fez with Abd al-Malik and the Ottoman army, Fez was easily conquered which then caused the Saadi ruler, Abu Abdallah Mohammed, to flee to Marrakesh. However, Marrakesh was also conquered. Abd al-Malik then assumed rule over Morocco as an Ottoman vassal recognising Ottoman suzerainty. Murad's name was recited in the Friday prayer and stamped on coinage marking the two traditional signs of sovereignty in the Islamic world. Abd al-Malik sent the Ottoman troops back to Algiers in exchange for gold while suggesting a looser concept of vassalage than the Ottoman sultan, Murad III, may have supposed. Abd al-Malik had recognised himself as a vassal of the Sublime Porte. The reign of Abd al-Malik (1576-1578) is understood to be a period of Moroccan vassalage to the Ottoman Empire.

Aftermath

After the victory, Abd al-Malik received a letter from Murad III offering fatherly congratulations, but expressing his disappointment at an unfinished job, as the deposed ruler, Abu Abdallah Mohammed, remained alive. He was the first Saadi ruler to break the tradition of not entering any bond of vassalage with a foreign entity and his letters described him as “Slave of the Great Turk.” He set his contingent of Turkish advisors to reshape his army along Ottoman lines.

In 1578, Abd al-Malik fought a battle against the Portuguese Empire in which he lost his life. However, the outcome of the battle was an immense victory. Abd al-Malik was succeeded by his brother Ahmad al-Mansur who formally recognised the suzerainty of the Ottoman Sultan at the beginning of his reign while remaining de facto independent. However, Ahmad stopped minting coins in Murad’s name, dropped Murad’s name from the Khutba and declared his full independence in 1582.

The Beylerbey of Algiers then convinced Murad III to authorise an attack on Morocco. Ahmad then sent an embassy with sizeable gifts to Constantinople, with the hopes of Murad III calling off the attack. The Moroccans paid a tribute of more than 100,000 gold coins and agreed to show respect to the Ottoman Sultan, in return they were unofficially left alone. They agreed to a treaty of mutual recognition and maintained peaceful relations. Every year Ahmad sent a gift to Istanbul which the Ottomans saw as a tribute, acknowledging their supremacy, and the Moroccans saw as a way of honouring the Ottomans for defending the Islamic lands.

References 

Ottoman Empire
16th-century conflicts
Wars involving the Ottoman Empire
Military history of Morocco